This article lists political parties in Costa Rica. 
Costa Rica used to have a two-party system, which meant that there were two dominant political parties, the Social Christian Unity Party and the National Liberation Party, with extreme difficulty for anybody to achieve electoral success under the banner of any other party. After the 2002 elections and the strong showing of the brand-new Citizens' Action Party, it was considered very likely that the old two-party system was on the verge of giving way to a multi-party system.  Several other parties have gained prominence since then, and the 2006 elections made it clear that Costa Rica is now a multi-party system.

Starting in the 2000s, disagreement about many of the neo-liberal policies promoted by the dominant PLN caused the traditional party system of alliances among a few parties to fracture. Although still a stable country, the shift toward many political parties and away from PUSC and PLN is a recent development. Various elected positions within the country, such as mayors and city council members, are held by many different national and local political parties.

Party Lists

Parliamentary fractions of the Legislative Assembly, 2022-2026

Extra-parliamentary parties

Local

Defunct/Inactive Political Parties

See also
 Politics of Costa Rica
 Elections in Costa Rica
 List of Costa Rican politicians

References

Costa Rica
 
Political parties
Institutions of Costa Rica
Government of Costa Rica
Costa Rica
Political parties